Foolad Mobarakeh Sepahan Isfahan Futsal Club was an Iranian professional futsal club based in Isfahan.

Season to season
The table below chronicles the achievements of the Club in various competitions.

Last updated: 14 March 2022

Notes:
* unofficial titles
1 worst title in history of club

Key

P   = Played
W   = Games won
D   = Games drawn
L   = Games lost

GF  = Goals for
GA  = Goals against
Pts = Points
Pos = Final position

Managers

Last updated: 6 September 2022

See also
 Foolad Mobarakeh Sepahan Sport Club

References

External links
 Official Website

Futsal clubs in Iran
Sport in Isfahan
2021 establishments in Iran